Doris Martyna Ansari  (née Ashurst; born 18 May 1941) is a former Liberal Democrat politician from Cornwall and Chairman of Cornwall County Council from 2005 to 2009. She was then opposition leader on Cornwall Council from 2009 until she stood down in 2011.

Early life
As Doris Ashurst, Ansari was born in Ince-in-Makerfield, Lancashire, on 18 May 1941, the daughter of John Ashurst and his wife Maggie Birch. In 1960, she married Asadullah Ansari in Farnworth. By 1962, they were living in Redruth, Cornwall, where their three children were born in the 1960s.

British politics

Cornish politics
Ansari was first elected to Truro City Council in 1971, to Carrick District Council when it was formed in 1973, standing as a Liberal, and to Cornwall County Council in 1980. In 1987, while she was chair of Cornwall County Council's planning and employment committee, she was shortlisted to be the Liberal candidate at the Truro by-election after the death of incumbent Liberal MP David Penhaligon; Matthew Taylor was eventually selected as the candidate and won the by-election.

She was the County Council's vice-chair from 1995 to 1997 and its chair from 2005 until its abolition in 2009. Ansari also held the post of Portfolio Holder for Education for a period. She was criticised for not including Cornish issues in the education curriculum, which she said would be "dangerous" and "put Cornwall on the road to the Balkans". Ansari was awarded an OBE in the 2000 New Year Honours for services to the community in Cornwall.

After the establishment of the unitary Cornwall Council, Ansari was elected by the Truro Tregolls division and became opposition leader and leader of the Liberal Democrats on the council from 2009 to 2011.

In April 2011, she announced she would be standing down as Liberal Democrat leader having been in local government for 40 years. She did not contest the 2013 election, being succeeded by Loic Rich. By the time of her retirement, Ansari was one of the longest serving members of the council.

Regional and national politics
Ansari was a member on several regional and national bodies throughout her career including the South West Regional Arts Council, the Milk and Dairies Tribunal, and the South West Rural Development Agency.

European politics
In 2003 and 2004, Ansari chaired the Committee on Social Cohesion of the Congress of Local and Regional Authorities of the Council of Europe and was a rapporteur for Congress reports. She was also a British representative to the Chamber of Regions at its 11th session in 2004.

Ansari was made a UK delegate to the European Committee of the Regions from 2008 to fill seats left vacant during the term of office which ended in 2010. She was renominated by the Local Government Association for the 2010–2015 term, but served only until 2013. She was Vice-President of the ALDE Group on the Committee between 2012 and 2013.

Electoral history

2009 Cornwall Council election

1979 Carrick District Council election

References

1941 births
Congress of the Council of Europe
Living people
Politics of Truro
Politicians from Cornwall
Members of Cornwall County Council
Members of Cornwall Council
Officers of the Order of the British Empire
English justices of the peace
Liberal Democrats (UK) councillors
Women councillors in England